The men's 20 kilometres walk was the shorter of the two men's racewalking events on the Athletics at the 1964 Summer Olympics program in Tokyo.  It was held on 15 October 1964.  35 athletes from 15 nations entered, with 30 starting and 26 finishing.

Results

Matthews and Lindner both beat the old best Olympic time.

References

Athletics at the 1964 Summer Olympics
Racewalking at the Olympics
Men's events at the 1964 Summer Olympics